Regency Road (and its eastern section as Muller Road) is a main east-west road forming a continuous connection between the inner northern suburbs of Adelaide, South Australia.

Route
Regency Road commences at the intersection of Torrens Road and David Terrance outside Arndale Shopping Centre, Kilkenny and heads east through Prospect to meet Hampstead Road in Broadview, where it continues eastwards as Muller Road to end at North East Road in Hampstead Gardens.

History
Regency Road was previously named Islington Road between Torrens Road and Churchill Road, Irish Harp Road between Churchill and Main North Roads, and Rakes Road from there to Hampstead Road. In 1970, four years after the Islington Sewage Farm had closed and the land fallen into disuse, the new suburb of Regency Park was created on the site and named in honour of Queen Elizabeth II (the regent) who visited Adelaide that year. At the same time, Islington Road, which formed the southern boundary of the suburb was re-gazetted (along with Irish Harp and Rakes Roads) as Regency Road.

In 2007 the intersection of Regency Road and Hampstead Road was upgraded to align Regency and Muller roads, creating a continuous east–west route from North East Road in the east to Torrens Road in the west.

The intersection of Regency Road and South Road was upgraded as part of the North–South Motorway. Construction started in 2019 and was completed in March 2021. The motorway now passes over Regency Road, with access in each direction via the South Road slip-roads.

Major intersections

Notes

Roads in Adelaide